Kifteh (also Romanized as Kīfteh; also known as Kīfleh) is a village in Padena-ye Olya Rural District, Padena District, Semirom County, Isfahan Province, Iran. At the 2006 census, its population was 1,025, in 214 families.

References 

Populated places in Semirom County